Bik Kwoon Yeung Tye (born c. 1947) is a Chinese-American molecular geneticist and structural biologist. Tye's pioneering work on eukaryotic DNA replication led to the discovery of the minichromosome maintenance (MCM) genes in 1984, which encode the catalytic core of the eukaryotic replisome. Tye also determined the first high-resolution structures of both the MCM complex and the Origin Recognition Complex (ORC) in 2015 and 2018. Tye is currently a Professor Emeritus (2015) at Cornell University and a visiting professor at the Hong Kong University of Science & Technology. She is married to Henry Sze-Hoi Tye and is the mother of Kay Tye and Lynne Tye.

Early life and education 
Tye was born and raised in Hong Kong where she attended St. Stephen's Girls’ College from kindergarten through high school. She then obtained a full scholarship to pursue undergraduate studies in chemistry at Wellesley College in Massachusetts, USA and graduated with a Bachelor of Arts in 1969. Upon graduation, Tye moved to California to complete an M.Sc. in biochemistry at the University of California San Francisco (UCSF) supervised by Cho Hao Li (李卓皓). Following her master's in 1971, Tye pursued Ph.D. training in genetics at the Massachusetts Institute of Technology under the joint mentorship of David Botstein and Joel Huberman. In 1974, Tye was awarded the Helen Hay Whitney Post-doctoral Research Fellowship with which she pursued further research training in molecular genetics under the supervision of Bob Lehman at Stanford University until 1977. Her post-doctoral work on DNA replication lead to the discovery of short Okazaki fragments generated during aberrant DNA repair in E.coli.

Career and research 
After Tye's foundational contributions to the field of prokaryotic DNA replication while at Stanford University she moved to Ithaca, New York and started her own laboratory at Cornell University in 1977. In her independent career, Tye began forging new discoveries surrounding DNA replication in eukaryotes, an understudied area at the time. Tye took a genetic approach to isolate mutants that regulate DNA replication which led to her identification of the minichromosome maintenance (MCM) genes in yeast in 1984. She specifically identified the MCM2, MCM3, MCM5 and MCM10 genes in yeast. Her findings together with the identification of the origin recognition complex (ORC) by Bell and Stillman in 1992 generated substantial momentum in the field of eukaryotic DNA replication.

Tye's contributions to the field continued throughout her tenure at Cornell. Throughout the 1990s, Tye functionally characterized the components of eukaryotic DNA replication machinery. At Cornell, Tye mentored numerous graduate students, was the associate chair of the Department of Biochemistry, Molecular, and Cell Biology, directed the Genetics and Development Graduate Studies Program, and finally received her Emerita status in 2015 for her contributions to the Cornell community.

More recently, Tye began a visiting professorship at the Hong Kong University of Science and Technology where she began to address a large gap in the field: the lack of high-resolution structures for ORC and MCM. To place genetic and biochemical DNA replication data into structural context, Tye began using cryogenic electron microscopy (cryo-EM) to identify the structures of these molecular complexes at near-atomic resolution. She helped determine the high resolution structures of the MCM complexes in 2015 and ORC in 2018.

Selected publications 

 Maine, G. T., Sinha, P. & Tye, B. K. Mutants of S. cerevisiae defective in the maintenance of minichromosomes. Genetics 106, 365-385 (1984).
 Sinha, P., Chang, V. & Tye, B. K. A mutant that affects the function of autonomously replicating sequences in yeast. J Mol Biol 192, 805-814 (1986).
 Yan, H., Gibson, S. & Tye, B. K. Mcm2 and Mcm3, two proteins important for ARS activity, are related in structure and function. Genes Dev 5, 944-957 (1991).
 Yan, H., Merchant, A. M. & Tye, B. K. Cell cycle-regulated nuclear localization of MCM2 and MCM3, which are required for the initiation of DNA synthesis at chromosomal replication origins in yeast. Genes Dev 7, 2149–2160 (1993).
 Lei, M., Kawasaki, Y., Young, M. R., Kihara, M., Sugino, A. & Tye, B. K. Mcm2 is a target of regulation by Cdc7-Dbf4 during the initiation of DNA synthesis. Genes Dev 11, 3365-3374 (1997).
 Homesley, L., Lei, M., Kawasaki, Y., Sawyer, S., Christensen, T. & Tye, B. K. Mcm10 and the MCM2-7 complex interact to initiate DNA synthesis and to release replication factors from origins. Genes Dev 14, 913-926 (2000).
 Shima, N., Alcaraz, A., Liachko, I., Buske, T. R., Andrews, C. A., Munroe, R. J., Hartford, S. A., Tye, B. K. & Schimenti, J. C. A viable allele of Mcm4 causes chromosome instability and mammary adenocarcinomas in mice. Nat Genet 39, 93-98, doi:10.1038/ng1936 (2007).
 Eisenberg, S., Korza, G., Carson, J., Liachko, I. & Tye, B. K. Novel DNA Binding Properties of the Mcm10 Protein from Saccharomyces cerevisiae. Journal of Biological Chemistry 284, 25412-25420, doi:10.1074/jbc.M109.033175 (2009).
 Lee, C., Liachko, I., Bouten, R., Kelman, Z. & Tye, B. K. Alternative Mechanisms for Coordinating Polymerase alpha and MCM Helicase. Molecular and Cellular Biology 30, 423-435, doi:10.1128/Mcb.01240-09 (2010).
 Li, N., Zhai, Y., Zhang, Y., Li, W., Yang, M., Lei, J., Tye, B. K. & Gao, N. Structure of the eukaryotic MCM complex at 3.8 A. Nature 524, 186-191, doi:10.1038/nature14685 (2015).
 Zhai, Y., Cheng, E., Wu, H., Li, N., Yung, P. Y., Gao, N. & Tye, B. K. Open-ringed structure of the Cdt1-Mcm2-7 complex as a precursor of the MCM double hexamer. Nat Struct Mol Biol 24, 300-308, doi:10.1038/nsmb.3374 (2017).
 Li, N., Lam, W. H., Zhai, Y., Cheng, J., Cheng, E., Zhao, Y., Gao, N. & Tye, B. K. Structure of the origin recognition complex bound to DNA replication origin. Nature 559, 217-222, doi:10.1038/s41586-018-0293-x (2018).
 Tye, B. K. The MCM2-3-5 proteins: are they replication licensing factors? Trends Cell Biol 4, 160-166 (1994).
 Tye, B. K. MCM proteins in DNA replication. Annu Rev Biochem 68, 649-686, doi: 10.1146/annurev.biochem.68.1.649 (1999).
 Tye, B. K. Insights into DNA replication from the third domain of life. P Natl Acad Sci USA 97, 2399–2401, doi:DOI 10.1073/pnas.97.6.2399 (2000).
 Tye, B. K. & Sawyer, S. The hexameric eukaryotic MCM helicase: Building symmetry from nonidentical parts. Journal of Biological Chemistry 275, 34833-34836, doi:DOI 10.1074/jbc.R000018200 (2000).
 Lei, M. & Tye, B. K. Initiating DNA synthesis: from recruiting to activating the MCM complex. J Cell Sci 114, 1447–1454 (2001).
 Zhai, Y., Li, N., Jiang, H., Huang, X., Gao, N. & Tye, B. K. Unique Roles of the Non- identical MCM Subunits in DNA Replication Licensing. Mol Cell 67, 168-179, doi: 10.1016/j.molcel.2017.06.016 (2017).

Personal life 
Tye is married to Henry Sze-Hoi Tye. Tye is the mother of Kay Tye, professor of systems neurobiology at the Salk Institute for Biological Studies, and Lynne Tye, web developer and founder of Key Values.

References 

Stanford University alumni
Hong Kong scientists
Cornell University faculty
American people of Chinese descent
Chinese geneticists
Wellesley College alumni
University of California, San Francisco alumni
Massachusetts Institute of Technology School of Science alumni
20th-century Chinese scientists
American women biologists
20th-century American biologists
1947 births
Living people
21st-century American biologists
Hong Kong emigrants to the United States
Women geneticists
21st-century Chinese scientists
21st-century American women scientists
20th-century American women scientists
American women academics